Altdorf is a municipality in the district of Böblingen in Baden-Württemberg in Germany.

References

Böblingen (district)
Württemberg